The Chaetosphaerellaceae are a family of fungi in the Ascomycota, class Sordariomycetes. The family was described in 2004. Species in the family have a widespread distribution, and are found in both temperate and tropical areas, where they grow saprobically on fallen wood.

Genera
As accepted by Wijayawardene et al. 2020;
 Chaetosphaerella  (4)
 Crassochaeta  (2)
 Spinulosphaeria  (2)

References

External links

Coronophorales
Ascomycota families